The Viví River is a river in Puerto Rico that runs through the town of Utuado and Adjuntas, Puerto Rico. It is about 11 miles long.

The town was to begin work on a bridge that goes over the Viví River in 2019, since its destruction on September 19, 2017 by Hurricane Maria.

See also

 List of rivers of Puerto Rico

References

External links
 USGS Hydrologic Unit Map – Caribbean Region (1974)

Rivers of Puerto Rico